Holy Cross College is an independent Roman Catholic secondary day school for boys, located in the Sydney suburb of Ryde, New South Wales, Australia, established in the tradition of the Patrician Brothers.

History and tradition
In 1808 Bishop Daniel Delany established in Ireland the Congregation of the Brothers of St Patrick and sought to have the youth of his native land instructed in the principles and lifestyle of the Gospels. The Patrician Brothers arrived in New South Wales in 1883, opening a Boarding College at Ryde in 1891. The College moved to its present site in 1896. The great sandstone edifice which is now a landmark of the district gradually rose on the heights above the Parramatta River. It celebrates its 125 years of educating young men in 2016.

Motto and crest
The Crest was designed in the early 1900s, and was installed in a stained glass window of the Oratory in the Monastery building. In 1959, a larger replica was installed in the new College Chapel. The Crest features the Waratah and Shamrock entwined, symbolising the shared Patrician Apostolate of Australia and Ireland. In one adaptation, the Harp is replaced by the Southern Cross. The overall design of the Crest is technically termed "Quarterly per Cross" and "Cross Fillet". The stars indicate the Southern Cross. Clockwise, from top left, the Quarters symbolise:
 The Bishop's Mitre, for Bishop Daniel Delany, founder of the Patrician Brothers (and the Brigidine Sisters).
 The Heart, as the universal symbol of love of God and mankind.
 The Book of Learning (education), as the embodiment of the Scriptures, the humanities and the sciences.
 The Harp, as the national emblem of Ireland, the country of origin of the Patrician Brothers...

Middle Schooling Program
Students entering the College in Year 7 have a core teacher who works with them in at least three subject areas. The team of core teachers work together to meld the curriculum outcomes across the several subjects they teach, thus 'buying back' class time and providing greater opportunity to engage in project-based learning, using notebook computers especially reserved for the Year 7 cohort. This approach to junior secondary schooling allows teachers to know students and their needs well and thus better cater for them. This approach to learning also encourages boys to 'learn how to learn', equipping them better for the greater independence and autonomy that come in the later high school years.

Information Communication Technology (ICT) 

Higher School Certificate results in ICT have in recent years been up to ten points above State average. The College possesses extensive computer facilities, including a new state-of-the-art Technology and Applied Studies (TAS) complex. Notebook computers are widely used by students throughout the school, with the option of a purchase/lease program to assist families who with their sons to have a personal notebook for home and school.

Principals
The following individuals have served as Principal of Holy Cross College:

Notable Former Students

 Chris Anderson - boarded and attended 6th form (Yr 12) 1971 while playing reserve and first grade for the Canterbury-Bankstown Bulldogs
 Sgt Harry Patrick Ashburner - original ANZAC
 Luke Brooks - Australian professional rugby league footballer for Wests Tigers
 Darren Clark - former Australian 200m and 400m sprint champion and dual Olympic Representative at the 1984 and 1988 Olympic Games
 Bishop Emeritus John Doggett - religious leader
 Zachariah Duke - academic and Honorary Archivist/Executive Officer for the Holy Cross College Old Boy Association
 Benny Elias - former Australian professional rugby league footballer for Balmain Tigers, NSW State of Origin, Australian Kangaroos
 Brigadier General Sir Peter Evans - Military
 Anthony Fisher - Archbishop of Sydney, Australia, 2014
 David Gower - Australian professional rugby league footballer for Wests Tigers, St. George Illawarra, Parramatta Eels
 Colonel Brett Greenland  - military
 Bronson Harrison - Australian professional rugby league footballer for Wests Tigers, Canberra Raiders, St. George Illawarra, New Zealand national rugby league team
 Jay Karutz - American professional & College Football player for Eastern Michigan University, Chicago Bears, 1st Team All MAC 2012, Academic All American 2012
 Nathan Milone - Australian professional rugby league footballer for Wests Tigers
 Mitchell Moses - Australian professional rugby league footballer for Parramatta Eels and New South Wales Blues
 Michael Mulcahy - musician
 Justin O'Brien - artist
 Jack Renshaw - Labor Premier of New South Wales from 30 April 1964 to 13 May 1965 politician)|Joseph Clark]] - Federal Parliament Member for seat of Darling for 35 years from 1934 to 1969.
 Mark Riddell - former Australian professional rugby league footballer for St. George Illawarra and Parramatta Eels
 Curtis Sironen - Australian professional rugby league footballer for Wests Tigers. He is the son of Paul Sironen
 Paul Sironen - former Australian professional rugby league footballer for Balmain Tigers, NSW State of Origin, Australian Kangaroos
 Jim Stride - Olympian (Rowing)
 Aaron Woods - Australian professional rugby league footballer for Wests Tigers, NSW State of Origin, Australian Kangaroos
 Maxwell L. Foran, PhD
Notable historian and author

See also

 List of Catholic schools in New South Wales
 Catholic education in Australia

References

Patrician Brothers schools
City of Ryde
Catholic secondary schools in Sydney
Educational institutions established in 1891
Metropolitan Catholic Colleges Sports Association
1891 establishments in Australia